Niroshan Mani (born 24 July 1988) is an Indian professional footballer who plays as a midfielder for Students Union in the Bangalore Super Division.

Career

Early career
Born in Bangalore, Karnataka, Mani is a product of the Tata Football Academy. After leaving Tata, Mani joined Sporting Clube de Goa for whom he mainly played with in the I-League 2nd Division and Goa Professional League. He was then sent on loan to South United of the Bangalore Super Division.

Bengaluru FC
On 11 September 2013 it was confirmed that Mani had signed with Bengaluru FC of the I-League for the 2013–14 season. He made his debut for the side on 29 September 2013 against Rangdajied United in which he came on in the 83rd minute for Vishal Kumar as Bengaluru won 3–0.

Students Union
After the 2013–14 I-League season, Mani signed for Students Union of the Bangalore Super Division.

Career statistics

References

External links 
 I-League Profile.

1988 births
Living people
Footballers from Bangalore
Indian footballers
Sporting Clube de Goa players
Bengaluru FC players
Association football midfielders
I-League players
I-League 2nd Division players